A rune is a letter in a set of related alphabets known as runic alphabets native to the Germanic peoples. Runes were used to write various Germanic languages (with some exceptions) before they adopted the Latin alphabet, and for specialised purposes thereafter. In addition to representing a sound value (a phoneme), runes can be used to represent the concepts after which they are named (ideographs).

Runology is the academic study of the runic alphabets, runic inscriptions, runestones, and their history. Runology forms a specialised branch of Germanic philology.

The earliest secure runic inscriptions date from around A.D. 150, with a potentially earlier inscription dating to A.D. 50 and Roman senator Tacitus's potential description of rune use from around A.D. 98. Runes were generally replaced by the Latin alphabet as the cultures that had used runes underwent Christianisation, by approximately A.D. 700 in central Europe and 1100 in northern Europe. However, the use of runes persisted for specialized purposes beyond this period. Up until the early 20th century, runes were still used in rural Sweden for decorative purposes in Dalarna and on runic calendars.

The three best-known runic alphabets are the Elder Futhark (ca. A.D. 150–800), the Anglo-Saxon Futhorc (400–1100), and the Younger Futhark (800–1100). The Younger Futhark developed further into the medieval runes (1100–1500), and the Dalecarlian runes ( 1500–1800).

The exact development of the early runic alphabet remains unclear but the script ultimately stems from the Phoenician alphabet. Early runes may have developed from the Raetic, Venetic, Etruscan, or Old Latin as candidates. At the time, all of these scripts had the same angular letter shapes suited for epigraphy, which would become characteristic of the runes and related scripts in the region.

The process of transmission of the script is unknown. The oldest clear inscriptions are found in Denmark and northern Germany. A "West Germanic hypothesis" suggests transmission via Elbe Germanic groups, while a "Gothic hypothesis" presumes transmission via East Germanic expansion. Runes continue to be used in a wide variety of ways in modern popular culture.

Name

Etymology 

It is the source of Gothic  ('secret, mystery, counsel'), Old English  ('whisper, mystery, secret, rune'), Old Saxon  ('secret counsel, confidential talk'), Middle Dutch  ('id'), Old High German  ('secret, mystery'), and Old Norse  ('secret, mystery, rune'). The earliest Germanic epigraphic attestation is the Primitive Norse  (accusative singular), found on the Einang stone (A.D. 350–400) and the Noleby stone (A.D. 450).

The term is related to Proto-Celtic  ('secret, magic'), which is attested in Old Irish  ('mystery, secret'), Middle Welsh  ('mystery, charm'), Middle Breton  ('secret wisdom'), and possibly in the ancient Gaulish  (<  'confident'; cf. However, it is difficult to tell whether they are cognates (linguistic siblings from a common origin), or if the Proto-Germanic form reflects an early borrowing from Celtic. Various connections have been proposed with other Indo-European terms (for example: Sanskrit   'roar', Latin  'noise, rumor'; Ancient Greek   'ask' and   'investigate'), although linguist Ranko Matasović finds them difficult to justify for semantic or linguistic reasons. Because of this, some scholars have speculated that the Germanic and Celtic words may have been a shared religious term borrowed from an unknown non-Indo-European language.

Related terms 
It is attested in Old Norse , Old English , and Old High German .

The Finnish word , meaning 'poem', is an early borrowing from Proto-Germanic, and the source of the term for rune, meaning 'scratched letter'. The root may also be found in the Baltic languages, where Lithuanian  means both 'to cut (with a knife)' and 'to speak'. 

The Old English form  survived into the early modern period as roun, which is now obsolete. The modern English rune is a later formation that is partly derived from Late Latin , Old Norse , and Danish .

History and use

The runes were in use among the Germanic peoples from the 1st or 2nd century AD.  This period corresponds to the late Common Germanic stage linguistically, with a continuum of dialects not yet clearly separated into the three branches of later centuries: North Germanic, West Germanic, and East Germanic.

No distinction is made in surviving runic inscriptions between long and short vowels, although such a distinction was certainly present phonologically in the spoken languages of the time. Similarly, there are no signs for labiovelars in the Elder Futhark (such signs were introduced in both the Anglo-Saxon futhorc and the Gothic alphabet as variants of p; see .)

Origins

The formation of the Elder Futhark was complete by the early 5th century, with the Kylver Stone being the first evidence of the futhark ordering as well as of the p rune.

Specifically, the Rhaetic alphabet of Bolzano is often advanced as a candidate for the origin of the runes, with only five Elder Futhark runes ( e,  ï,  j,  ŋ,  p) having no counterpart in the Bolzano alphabet. Scandinavian scholars tend to favor derivation from the Latin alphabet itself over Raetic candidates. A "North Etruscan" thesis is supported by the inscription on the Negau helmet dating to the 2nd century BC. This is in a northern Etruscan alphabet but features a Germanic name, . Giuliano and Larissa Bonfante suggest that runes derived from some North Italic alphabet, specifically Venetic: but since Romans conquered Veneto after 200 BC, and then the Latin alphabet became prominent and Venetic culture diminished in importance, Germanic people could have adopted the Venetic alphabet within the 3rd century BC or even earlier.

The angular shapes of the runes are shared with most contemporary alphabets of the period that were used for carving in wood or stone. There are no horizontal strokes: when carving a message on a flat staff or stick, it would be along the grain, thus both less legible and more likely to split the wood. This characteristic is also shared by other alphabets, such as the early form of the Latin alphabet used for the Duenos inscription, but it is not universal, especially among early runic inscriptions, which frequently have variant rune shapes, including horizontal strokes. Runic manuscripts (that is written rather than carved runes, such as ) also show horizontal strokes.

The "West Germanic hypothesis" speculates on an introduction by West Germanic tribes. This hypothesis is based on claiming that the earliest inscriptions of the 2nd and 3rd centuries, found in bogs and graves around Jutland (the Vimose inscriptions), exhibit word endings that, being interpreted by Scandinavian scholars to be Proto-Norse, are considered unresolved and long having been the subject of discussion. Since names ending in  reflect Germanic morphology representing the Latin ending , and the suffix  was reflected by Germanic , the question of the problematic ending  in masculine Proto-Norse would be resolved by assuming Roman (Rhineland) influences, while "the awkward ending -a of  may be solved by accepting the fact that the name may indeed be West Germanic". In the early Runic period, differences between Germanic languages are generally presumed to be small. Another theory presumes a Northwest Germanic unity preceding the emergence of Proto-Norse proper from roughly the 5th century. An alternative suggestion explaining the impossibility of classifying the earliest inscriptions as either North or West Germanic is forwarded by È. A. Makaev, who presumes a "special runic koine", an early "literary Germanic" employed by the entire Late Common Germanic linguistic community after the separation of Gothic (2nd to 5th centuries), while the spoken dialects may already have been more diverse.

The Meldorf fibula and Tacitus's Germania
With the potential exception of the Meldorf fibula, a possible runic inscription found in Schleswig-Holstein dating to around 50 AD, the earliest reference to runes (and runic divination) may occur in Roman Senator Tacitus's ethnographic Germania.
Dating from around 98 CE, Tacitus describes the Germanic peoples as utilizing a divination practice involving rune-like inscriptions:
For divination and casting lots they have the highest possible regard. Their procedure for casting lots is uniform: They break off the branch of a fruit tree and slice into strips; they mark these by certain signs and throw them, as random chance will have it, on to a white cloth. Then a state priest, if the consultation is a public one, or the father of the family, if it is private, prays to the gods and, gazing to the heavens, picks up three separate strips and reads their meaning from the marks scored on them. If the lots forbid an enterprise, there can be no further consultation about it that day; if they allow it, further confirmation by divination is required.
As Victoria Symons summarizes, "If the inscriptions made on the lots that Tacitus refers to are understood to be letters, rather than other kinds of notations or symbols, then they would necessarily have been runes, since no other writing system was available to Germanic tribes at this time."

Early inscriptions

Runic inscriptions from the 400-year period 150–550 AD are described as "Period I". These inscriptions are generally in Elder Futhark, but the set of letter shapes and bindrunes employed is far from standardized. Notably the j, s, and ŋ runes undergo considerable modifications, while others, such as p and ï, remain unattested altogether prior to the first full futhark row on the Kylver Stone ( 400 AD).

Artifacts such as spear heads or shield mounts have been found that bear runic marking that may be dated to 200 AD, as evidenced by artifacts found across northern Europe in Schleswig (North Germany), Funen, Zealand, Jutland (Denmark), and Scania (Sweden). Earlier—but less reliable—artifacts have been found in Meldorf, in northern Germany; these include brooches and combs found in graves, most notably the Meldorf fibula, and are supposed to have the earliest markings resembling runic inscriptions.

Magical or divinatory use

The stanza 157 of  attribute to runes the power to bring that which is dead back to life. In this stanza, Odin recounts a spell:

The earliest runic inscriptions found on artifacts give the name of either the craftsman or the proprietor, or sometimes, remain a linguistic mystery. Due to this, it is possible that the early runes were not used so much as a simple writing system, but rather as magical signs to be used for charms. Although some say the runes were used for divination, there is no direct evidence to suggest they were ever used in this way. The name rune itself, taken to mean "secret, something hidden", seems to indicate that knowledge of the runes was originally considered esoteric, or restricted to an elite. The 6th-century Björketorp Runestone warns in Proto-Norse using the word rune in both senses:

The same curse and use of the word, rune, is also found on the Stentoften Runestone. There also are some inscriptions suggesting a medieval belief in the magical significance of runes, such as the Franks Casket (AD 700) panel.

Much speculation and study has been produced on the potential meaning of these inscriptions. Further, an inscription on the Gummarp Runestone (500–700 AD) gives a cryptic inscription describing the use of three runic letters followed by the Elder Futhark f-rune written three times in succession.

Nevertheless, it has proven difficult to find unambiguous traces of runic "oracles": although Norse literature is full of references to runes, it nowhere contains specific instructions on divination.  There are at least three sources on divination with rather vague descriptions that may, or may not, refer to runes: Tacitus's 1st-century , Snorri Sturluson's 13th-century , and Rimbert's 9th-century .

The first source, Tacitus's , describes "signs" chosen in groups of three and cut from "a nut-bearing tree", although the runes do not seem to have been in use at the time of Tacitus' writings. There, the "chips" fell in a way that said that he would not live long.

The third source is Rimbert's , where there are three accounts of what some believe to be the use of runes for divination, but Rimbert calls it "drawing lots". One of these accounts is the description of how a renegade Swedish king, Anund Uppsale, first brings a Danish fleet to Birka, but then changes his mind and asks the Danes to "draw lots". According to the story, this "drawing of lots" was quite informative, telling them that attacking Birka would bring bad luck and that they should attack a Slavic town instead.

The lack of extensive knowledge on historical use of the runes has not stopped modern authors from extrapolating entire systems of divination from what few specifics exist, usually loosely based on the reconstructed names of the runes and additional outside influence.

A recent study of runic magic suggests that runes were used to create magical objects such as amulets, but not in a way that would indicate that runic writing was any more inherently magical, than were other writing systems such as Latin or Greek.

Medieval use

As Proto-Germanic evolved into its later language groups, the words assigned to the runes and the sounds represented by the runes themselves began to diverge somewhat and each culture would create new runes, rename or rearrange its rune names slightly, or stop using obsolete runes completely, to accommodate these changes. Thus, the Anglo-Saxon futhorc has several runes peculiar to itself to represent diphthongs unique to (or at least prevalent in) the Anglo-Saxon dialect.

Some later runic finds are on monuments (runestones), which often contain solemn inscriptions about people who died or performed great deeds. For a long time it was presumed that this kind of grand inscription was the primary use of runes, and that their use was associated with a certain societal class of rune carvers.

In the mid-1950s, however, approximately 670 inscriptions, known as the Bryggen inscriptions, were found in Bergen. These inscriptions were made on wood and bone, often in the shape of sticks of various sizes, and contained inscriptions of an everyday nature—ranging from name tags, prayers (often in Latin), personal messages, business letters, and expressions of affection, to bawdy phrases of a profane and sometimes even of a vulgar nature. Following this find, it is nowadays commonly presumed that, at least in late use, Runic was a widespread and common writing system.

In the later Middle Ages, runes also were used in the clog almanacs (sometimes called Runic staff, Prim, or Scandinavian calendar) of Sweden and Estonia. The authenticity of some monuments bearing Runic inscriptions found in Northern America is disputed; most of them have been dated to modern times.

Runes in Eddic poetry
In Norse mythology, the runic alphabet is attested to a divine origin. This is attested as early as on the Noleby Runestone from  that reads , meaning "I prepare the suitable divine rune..." and in an attestation from the 9th century on the Sparlösa Runestone, which reads , meaning "And interpret the runes of divine origin". In the Poetic Edda poem , Stanza 80, the runes also are described as :

The poem  explains that the originator of the runes was the major deity, Odin. Stanza 138 describes how Odin received the runes through self-sacrifice:

In stanza 139, Odin continues:

In the Poetic Edda poem  another origin is related of how the runic alphabet became known to humans. These sons became the ancestors of the three classes of humans indicated by their names. When Jarl reached an age when he began to handle weapons and show other signs of nobility,  returned and, having claimed him as a son, taught him the runes. In 1555, the exiled Swedish archbishop  recorded a tradition that a man named  had stolen three rune staffs from Odin and learned the runes and their magic.

Runic alphabets

Elder Futhark (2nd to 8th centuries) 

The Elder Futhark, used for writing Proto-Norse, consists of 24 runes that often are arranged in three groups of eight; each group is referred to as an Ætt (Old Norse, meaning 'clan, group'). The earliest known sequential listing of the full set of 24 runes dates to approximately AD 400 and is found on the Kylver Stone in Gotland, Sweden.

Most probably each rune had a name, chosen to represent the sound of the rune itself. The names are, however, not directly attested for the Elder Futhark themselves. Germanic philologists reconstruct names in Proto-Germanic based on the names given for the runes in the later alphabets attested in the rune poems and the linked names of the letters of the Gothic alphabet. For example, the letter /a/ was named from the runic letter  called Ansuz. An asterisk before the rune names means that they are unattested reconstructions. The 24 Elder Futhark runes are the following:

Anglo-Saxon runes (5th to 11th centuries) 

The futhorc (sometimes written "fuþorc") are an extended alphabet, consisting of 29, and later 33 characters. It was probably used from the 5th century onwards. There are competing theories as to the origins of the Anglo-Saxon Futhorc. One theory proposes that it was developed in Frisia and later spread to England, while another holds that Scandinavians introduced runes to England, where the futhorc was modified and exported to Frisia. Some examples of futhorc inscriptions are found on the Thames scramasax, in the Vienna Codex, in Cotton Otho B.x (Anglo-Saxon rune poem) and on the Ruthwell Cross.

The Anglo-Saxon rune poem gives the following characters and names:  feoh,  ur,  þorn,  os,  rad,  cen,  gyfu,  ƿynn,  hægl,  nyd,  is,  ger,  eoh,  peorð,  eolh,  sigel,  tir,  beorc,  eh,  mann,  lagu,  ing,  œthel,  dæg,  ac,  æsc,  yr,  ior,  ear.

Extra runes attested to outside of the rune poem include  cweorð,  calc,  gar, and  stan. Some of these additional letters have only been found in manuscripts. Feoh, þorn, and sigel stood for [f], [þ], and [s] in most environments, but voiced to [v], [ð], and [z] between vowels or voiced consonants. Gyfu and wynn stood for the letters yogh and wynn, which became [g] and [w] in Middle English.

"Marcomannic runes" (8th to 9th centuries)

A runic alphabet consisting of a mixture of Elder Futhark with Anglo-Saxon futhorc is recorded in a treatise called De Inventione Litterarum, ascribed to Hrabanus Maurus and preserved in 8th- and 9th-century manuscripts mainly from the southern part of the Carolingian Empire (Alemannia, Bavaria). The manuscript text attributes the runes to the Marcomanni, quos nos Nordmannos vocamus, and hence traditionally, the alphabet is called "Marcomannic runes", but it has no connection with the Marcomanni, and rather is an attempt of Carolingian scholars to represent all letters of the Latin alphabets with runic equivalents.

Wilhelm Grimm discussed these runes in 1821.

Younger Futhark (9th to 11th centuries)

The Younger Futhark, also called Scandinavian Futhark, is a reduced form of the Elder Futhark, consisting of only 16 characters. The reduction correlates with phonetic changes when Proto-Norse evolved into Old Norse. They are found in Scandinavia and Viking Age settlements abroad, probably in use from the 9th century onward. They are divided into long-branch (Danish) and short-twig (Swedish and Norwegian) runes.  The difference between the two versions is a matter of controversy. A general opinion is that the difference between them was functional (viz., the long-branch runes were used for documentation on stone, whereas the short-twig runes were in everyday use for private or official messages on wood).

Medieval runes  (12th to 15th centuries)

In the Middle Ages, the Younger Futhark in Scandinavia was expanded, so that it once more contained one sign for each phoneme of the Old Norse language. Dotted variants of voiceless signs were introduced to denote the corresponding voiced consonants, or vice versa, voiceless variants of voiced consonants, and several new runes also appeared for vowel sounds. Inscriptions in medieval Scandinavian runes show a large number of variant rune forms, and some letters, such as s, c, and z often were used interchangeably.

Medieval runes were in use until the 15th century. Of the total number of Norwegian runic inscriptions preserved today, most are medieval runes.  Notably, more than 600 inscriptions using these runes have been discovered in Bergen since the 1950s, mostly on wooden sticks (the so-called Bryggen inscriptions). This indicates that runes were in common use side by side with the Latin alphabet for several centuries. Indeed, some of the medieval runic inscriptions are written in Latin.

Dalecarlian runes (16th to 19th centuries)

According to Carl-Gustav Werner, "In the isolated province of Dalarna in Sweden a mix of runes and Latin letters developed."  The Dalecarlian runes came into use in the early 16th century and remained in some use up to the 20th century. Some discussion remains on whether their use was an unbroken tradition throughout this period or whether people in the 19th and 20th centuries learned runes from books written on the subject. The character inventory was used mainly for transcribing Elfdalian.

Differences from Roman script
While Roman script would ultimately replace runes in most contexts, it differed significantly from runic script. For example, on the differences between the use of Anglo-Saxon runes and the Latin script that would come to replace them, runologist Victoria Symons says:
As well as being distinguished from the roman alphabet in visual appearance and letter order, the fuþorc is further set apart by the fact that, unlike their roman counterparts, runic letters are often associated not only with sound values but also with names. These names are often nouns and, in almost all instances, they begin with the sound value represented by the associated letter. ... The fact that each rune represents but a sound value and a word gives this writing system a multivalent quality that further distinguishes it from roman script. A roman letter simply represents its sound value. When used, for example, for the purpose of pagination, such letters can assume added significance, but this is localised to the context of an individual manuscript. Runic letters, on the other hand, are inherently multivalent; they can, and often do, represent several different kinds of information simultaneously. This aspect of runic letters is one that is frequently employed and exploited by writers and scribes who include them in their manuscripts.

Use as ideographs (Begriffsrunen)
In addition to their historic use as letters in the runic alphabets, runes were also used to represent their names (ideographs). Such instances are sometimes referred to by way of the modern German loan word Begriffsrunen, meaning 'concept-runes' (singular Begriffsrune). The criteria for the use of Begriffsrunen and the frequency of their use by ancient rune-writers remains controversial. The topic of Begriffsrunen has produced much discussion among runologists. Runologist Klaus Düwel has proposed a two-point criteria for the identification of runes as Begriffsrunen: A graphic argument and a semantic argument.

Examples of Begriffsrunen (or potential Begriffsrunen) include the following:

In addition to the instances above, several different runes occur as ideographs in Old English and Old Norse manuscripts (featuring Anglo-Saxon runes and Younger Futhark runes respectively). Runologist Thomas Birkett summarizes these numerous instances as follows:

Academic study

The modern study of runes was initiated during the Renaissance, by Johannes Bureus (1568–1652). Bureus viewed runes as holy or magical in a kabbalistic sense. The study of runes was continued by Olof Rudbeck Sr (1630–1702) and presented in his collection Atlantica. Anders Celsius (1701–1744) further extended the science of runes and travelled around the whole of Sweden to examine the runstenar.  From the  "golden age of philology" in the 19th century, runology formed a specialized branch of Germanic linguistics.

Body of inscriptions

The largest group of surviving Runic inscription are Viking Age Younger Futhark runestones, commonly found in Denmark and Sweden. Another large group are medieval runes, most commonly found on small objects, often wooden sticks. The largest concentration of runic inscriptions are the Bryggen inscriptions found in Bergen, more than 650 in total. Elder Futhark inscriptions number around 350, about 260 of which are from Scandinavia, of which about half are on bracteates. Anglo-Saxon futhorc inscriptions number around 100 items.

Modern use

Runic alphabets have seen numerous uses since the 18th-century Viking revival, in Scandinavian Romantic nationalism (Gothicismus) and Germanic occultism in the 19th century, and in the context of the Fantasy genre and of Germanic Neopaganism in the 20th century.

Esotericism

Germanic mysticism and Nazi Germany 

The pioneer of the Armanist branch of Ariosophy and one of the more important figures in esotericism in Germany and Austria in the late 19th and early 20th century was the Austrian occultist, mysticist, and völkisch author, Guido von List. In 1908, he published in Das Geheimnis der Runen ("The Secret of the Runes") a set of eighteen so-called, "Armanen runes", based on the Younger Futhark and runes of List's own introduction, which allegedly were revealed to him in a state of temporary blindness after cataract operations on both eyes in 1902.
The use of runes in Germanic mysticism, notably List's "Armanen runes" and the derived "Wiligut runes" by Karl Maria Wiligut, played a certain role in Nazi symbolism. The fascination with runic symbolism was mostly limited to Heinrich Himmler, and not shared by the other members of the Nazi top echelon. Consequently, runes appear mostly in insignia associated with the Schutzstaffel ("SS"), the paramilitary organization led by Himmler. Wiligut is credited with designing the SS-Ehrenring, which displays a number of "Wiligut runes".

Modern neopaganism and esotericism
Runes are popular in Germanic neopaganism, and to a lesser extent in other forms of Neopaganism and New Age esotericism. Various systems of Runic divination have been published since the 1980s, notably by Ralph Blum (1982), Stephen Flowers (1984, onward), Stephan Grundy (1990), and Nigel Pennick (1995).

The Uthark theory originally was proposed as a scholarly hypothesis by Sigurd Agrell in 1932.
In 2002, Swedish esotericist Thomas Karlsson popularized this "Uthark" runic row, which he refers to as, the "night side of the runes", in the context of modern occultism.

Bluetooth 

The Bluetooth logo is the combination of two runes of the Younger Futhark,  hagall and  bjarkan, equivalent to the letters H and B, that are the initials of Harald Blåtand's name (Bluetooth in English), who was a king of Denmark from the Viking Age.

J. R. R. Tolkien and contemporary fiction

In J. R. R. Tolkien's novel The Hobbit (1937), the Anglo-Saxon runes are used on a map and on the title page to emphasize its connection to the Dwarves. They also were used in the initial drafts of The Lord of the Rings, but later were replaced by the Cirth rune-like alphabet invented by Tolkien, used to write the language of the Dwarves, Khuzdul.  Following Tolkien, historical and fictional runes appear commonly in modern popular culture, particularly in fantasy literature, but also in other forms of media such as video games (for example the 1992 video game Heimdall used it as "magical symbols" associated with unnatural forces) and role-playing games, such as the Ultima series which use a runic font for in-game signs and printed maps and booklets, and Metagaming's The Fantasy Trip, which used rune-based cipher for clues and jokes throughout its publications.

Unicode

Runic alphabets were added to the Unicode Standard in September, 1999 with the release of version 3.0.

The Unicode block for Runic alphabets is U+16A0–U+16FF. It is intended to encode the letters of the Elder Futhark, the Anglo-Frisian runes, and the Younger Futhark long-branch and short-twig (but not the staveless) variants, in cases where cognate letters have the same shape resorting to "unification".

The block as of Unicode 3.0 contained 81 symbols: 75 runic letters (U+16A0–U+16EA), 3 punctuation marks (Runic Single Punctuation U+16EB , Runic Multiple Punctuation U+16EC  and Runic Cross Punctuation U+16ED ), and three runic symbols that are used in early modern runic calendar staves ("Golden number Runes", Runic Arlaug Symbol U+16EE , Runic Tvimadur Symbol U+16EF , Runic Belgthor Symbol U+16F0 ). As of Unicode 7.0 (2014), eight characters were added, three attributed to J. R. R. Tolkien's mode of writing Modern English in Anglo-Saxon runes, and five for the "cryptogrammic" vowel symbols used in an inscription on the Franks Casket.

See also
 Bautil
 Gothic runic inscriptions
 List of runestones
 
 Runiform (disambiguation), various scripts having a "rune-like" appearance
 Runic magic

Notes

References

Sources

 

 Birkett, Thomas. 2010. "The alysendlecan rune: Runic abbreviations in their immediate literary context ". Preprints to The 7th International Symposium on Runes and Runic Inscriptions, Oslo 2010 . Last accessed 29 August, 2021. University of Oslo. 

 
 Düwel, Klaus. 2004. "Runic" in Malcolm Read and Brian Murdoch (editors). Early Germanic Literature and Culture, p. 121–147. Boydell & Brewer. . 
 .
 

 .
 
 .
 .
 
 .
 .
 
 .
 .
 .

External links

 .
 .
 .
 
 .
 Old Norse Online by Todd B. Krause and Jonathan Slocum, free online lessons at the Linguistics Research Center at the University of Texas at Austin, contains a lesson on runic inscriptions

 
 
Alphabets
Language and mysticism
Obsolete writing systems
Germanic culture
Magic symbols